The 1947 Washington State Cougars football team was an American football team that represented Washington State College in the Pacific Coast Conference (PCC) during the 1947 college football season. Phil Sarboe, in his third of five seasons as head coach at Washington State, led the team to a 2–5 mark in the PCC and 3–7 overall.

The Cougars' three home games were played on campus in Pullman at Rogers Field, with a nearby road game in Moscow against Palouse neighbor Idaho.

Schedule

References

External links
 Game program: Michigan State at WSC – October 11, 1947
 Game program: Montana at WSC – October 25, 1947
 Game program: Oregon at WSC – November 8, 1947

Washington State
Washington State Cougars football seasons
Washington State Cougars football